Bolshaya Usa is a rural locality (a selo) and the administrative center of Bolsheusinskoye Rural Settlement, Kuyedinsky District, Perm Krai, Russia. The population was 1,601 as of 2010. There are 28 streets.

Geography 
Bolshaya Usa is located 50 km northwest of Kuyeda (the district's administrative centre) by road. Okulov is the nearest rural locality.

References 

Rural localities in Kuyedinsky District